Alexandria Eschate ("Furthest Alexandria") was a city founded by Alexander the Great, at the south-western end of the Fergana Valley (modern Tajikistan) in August 329 BC. It was the most northerly outpost of Alexander's Empire in Central Asia. Alexandria Eschate was established on the south bank of the river Jaxartes (Syr Darya), at or close to the site of modern Khujand (Хуҷанд; خجند). According to the Roman writer Curtius, Alexandria Ultima retained its Hellenistic culture as late as 30 BC.

History
This region where Alexandria Eschate would be founded was ruled over by Persia starting with Xerxes I, and began to be populated by Greeks starting at that time. When "Greeks" (Greek-related and speaking peoples) in other parts of the Persian empire rebelled or otherwise were troublesome, they would be exiled to the far northeast of the Persian empire, the most distant segment from their homelands. This was not uncommon, because the coastline of Asia Minor was populated by many Greek-culture and language cities, who had colonized the region in the previous centuries. By the time of the fall of Persia to Alexander the Great, many had been exiled to this region north of India, so Greek villages, language, and culture were therefore all common in that area. Cyrus the Great founded a city there as his northeastern-most outpost, known as Cyropolis, which may have later become the site of Alexandria Eschate, simply renamed.

Alexander the Great
Alexander, during his years of conquest, would regularly establish long-term outposts to support his advance, either renaming and permanently securing an existing city, or creating a long-term, albeit non-permanent, outpost built up like a town. According to Greek historian Plutarch, Alexander named seventy of these bases after himself, though this may be an exaggeration; only a couple dozen are known today.

In order to secure Sogdiana, the northeastern corner of the Persian empire, Alexander targeted Cyropolis and a half dozen other cities in 329 BC.

Alexander first sent Craterus to Cyropolis, the largest of the towns holding Sogdiana against Alexander's forces. Craterus' instructions were to "take up a position close to the town, surround it with a ditch and stockade, and then assemble such siege engines as might suit his purpose...." The idea was to keep the inhabitants focused on their own defenses and to prevent them from sending assistance out to the other towns. Starting from Gazza, Alexander went on to conquer the other surrounding towns. Five of the seven towns were taken in two days. Many of the inhabitants were killed. Alexander then arrived at Cyropolis, which was the best fortified of the towns and had the largest population. It also had reputedly the best fighters of the region. Alexander battered Cyropolis' defenses with the siege engines. While the bombardment went on, Alexander ordered certain of his troops to sneak through a dried-up water course that went under the town's wall. Alexander also joined on this mission and once inside his troops opened the town's gate to admit his attacking force. Once the natives saw that the town was taken, they fell violently upon the attackers. Alexander received a violent blow from a stone that landed upon his head and neck. Craterus was wounded by an arrow. But the defenders were driven off. Arrian puts the defender's force at about 15,000 fighting men and claims that 8,000 of them were killed in the first phase of the operation. The rest apparently sought refuge inside the town's central fortress, but surrendered after one day for lack of water.

Accounts of how the battle went down differ among authors. Arrian cites Ptolemy as saying Cyropolis surrendered from the start, and Arrian also states that according to Aristobulus the place was stormed and everyone was massacred.

One, probably Cyropolis, came to be called Alexandria Eschate, his northeastern-most outpost. As with most other cities founded by Alexander, a group of retired and/or wounded veterans from his army was settled there, joining the large population of Greek exiles settled in the area by Persia in previous generations.

Hellenistic period
It experienced numerous conflicts with the local population.

From 250 BC, the city likely had greater contact with Bactria, after the Greco-Bactrian king Euthydemus I extended his control into Sogdiana.

There are indications that Greek expeditions travelled as far as Kashgar. The historian Strabo claims that the Greeks "extended their empire even as far as the Seres and the Phryni .

"Seres" meant either China proper – in which case the Greeks achieved the first direct contact between China and a European society, some time around 200 BC – or the peoples of the Tarim. In any case, a city known to the Chinese as Dayuan, which was mentioned by scholars from the Han dynasty (1st century BC to 2nd century AD), is speculated to refer to Alexandria Eschate.  The prefix da  meant "Great", while the suffix Yuan was the Chinese rendition of Ionians.

Chinese embassies were established in Dayuan, beginning with Zhang Qian opened around 130 BC.  Soon the city and the rest of Dayuan were conquered completely by the Han after winning the War of the Heavenly Horses. This contributed to the opening up the Silk Road from the 1st century BC.  Dayuan means "Great Ionians" in the Chinese language, Greeks generally being known in Asia by some variant of "Ionians". See Names of the Greeks: Ionians, Yunani, and Yavan for more information.

Archaeological remains
The remains of Alexander's town lie in the tell of the old citadel in Khojand. Although the oldest surface remains of the walls date only to the 10th century, Soviet and Tajik excavations of the site have revealed that below the modern surface are medieval, Hellenistic and Achaemenid layers.  These layers have revealed fortifications dating to around the 4th century BC.

Other remains include household utensils, armaments and building materials which are exhibited in the Museum of Regional Studies in Khojand. The site has also revealed numerous Hellenistic coins and pottery.

In the Tabula Peutingeriana, below the city there is a rhetorical question in Latin: "Hic Alexander responsum accepit: usque quo Alexander?" — referencing both his insatiable appetite for conquest and a legend from the Alexander Romance in which "celestial creatures" admonished Alexander to not pursue further explorations, which would ultimately lead to his untimely death.

In fiction
Alexandria Eschate is the final destination of Euxenus, son of Eutychides of the deme of Pallene, the protagonist of Alexander at the World's End by Tom Holt.

Horses of Heaven, by Gillian Bradshaw, is set in Alexandria Eschate, c. 140 BC, talks about the Ferghana horses and the War of the Heavenly Horses fought with Han China.

See also
 Cyropolis
 List of cities founded by Alexander the Great

Footnotes

References
See the notes on "Northern Wuyi" = Alexandria Eschate in the draft annotated translation of the 3rd-century Chinese history, the Weilüe, by John Hill at:   and

External links
 Livius.org: Alexandria Eschatê

329 BC
Populated places established in the 4th century BC
Cities founded by Alexander the Great
Former countries in Central Asia
Han dynasty
Populated places along the Silk Road
Bactrian and Indian Hellenistic period
Cities in Central Asia
Hellenistic sites
320s BC establishments